Robert Woodson (born October 4, 1995) is a professional Canadian football defensive back for the Toronto Argonauts of the Canadian Football League (CFL). He played U Sports football with the Calgary Dinos from 2013 to 2016.

Professional career
Woodson was drafted by the Argonauts 27th overall in the 2017 CFL Draft and signed a two-year contract with the club on May 22, 2017. He made the active roster following training camp and played in his first professional regular season game on June 25, 2017 against the Hamilton Tiger-Cats where he recorded four defensive tackles. For the 2017 season, he played in 12 regular season games and had eight defensive tackles and seven special teams tackles. He also played in both post-season games that year and played in his first Grey Cup game while in his rookie year. He won his first championship following the Argonauts' 105th Grey Cup win over the Calgary Stampeders where he posted two special teams tackles in the game.

In 2018, Woodson had two stints on the injured list, but managed to play in 14 regular season games where he recorded eight defensive tackles and nine special teams tackles. He earned his first professional start on September 8, 2018 in a game against the Tiger-Cats in the Labour Day rematch. The Argonauts did not qualify for the playoffs in 2018.

Scheduled to become a free agent in 2019, Woodson opted to re-sign with the Argonauts on January 29, 2019, to another two-year contract. He played in 15 regular season games, and started eight, spending time at cornerback, halfback, and safety. He had a career-high 24 defensive tackles, seven special teams tackles, and two forced fumbles.

Woodson re-signed with the Argonauts on February 6, 2021. He was placed on the suspended list on July 10, 2021.

Personal life
Woodson's older brother, Anthony Woodson, also played in the CFL over six years for the Winnipeg Blue Bombers, Argonauts, Hamilton Tiger-Cats, and Calgary Stampeders. The two were on opposite sides in the 105th Grey Cup game while Anthony played for the Stampeders.

References

External links
Toronto Argonauts bio 

1995 births
Living people
Toronto Argonauts players
Calgary Dinos football players
Canadian football defensive backs
Players of Canadian football from Alberta
Canadian football people from Calgary